The grade point average (GPA) in Chile ranges from 1.0 up to 7.0 (with one decimal place).

Rounding of averages is generally done to the second decimal; hence, a 3.95 is rounded up to a 4.0, whereas a 3.94 is rounded down to a 3.9.

Usually in higher level education such as university degrees, 80% of the passing grades are in the 4.5 - 5.4 range and a grade exceeding 5.0 is normally considered "good". While in the U.S. highly competitive students have A grades, in Chile these same students tend to average 6,8 , 6,9 or 7,0, all of which are considered near perfect grades.

An overall GPA in university degrees that ranges from 5.5 to 5.9 is uncommon and is considered a "very good" academic standing. Exceeding 6.0 is considered "high academic excellence".

References

Chile
Grading
Grading